1996 saw many sequels and prequels in video games, such as Super Mario 64, Duke Nukem 3D, Street Fighter Alpha 2, Super Mario RPG, Virtua Fighter 3, and Tekken 3, along with new titles such as Blazing Heroes, NiGHTS into Dreams..., Crash Bandicoot, Pokémon Red/Green/Blue, Resident Evil, Dead or Alive, Quake and Tomb Raider.

The year's best-selling video game console worldwide was the PlayStation, while the best-selling consoles in Japan were the Game Boy and Sega Saturn. The year's best-selling home video game worldwide was Super Mario 64, while highest-grossing arcade games in Japan were Street Fighter Zero 2 (Street Fighter Alpha 2) and Virtua Fighter 2.

Events
March – Swedish video game magazine "Super Power" changes name to Super Play.
15 July – Tom Kalinske announces he will leave his position as president for Sega of America on 1 October.
May 16–18 – The second annual E3 is held in Los Angeles, California, United States.
7 September - Sega opens SegaWorld London as part of the London Trocadero in England. It is the first Sega World park to open outside of Japan. 
1 October – Tom Kalinske resigns as president for Sega of America.
December 31 – Battle.net Classic is released.

Hardware 

 February 21 – Sega Model 3, an arcade system board considered to have the most technically impressive graphics at the time
 November 23 – Bandai's Tamagotchi virtual pet handheld
 Nintendo's Nintendo 64, the first true 64-bit home console
 Nintendo's Game Boy Pocket (GBP) handheld console (30% smaller version of the previous Game Boy handheld console)
 Sega's Net Link modem for the Sega Saturn home console
 SNK's Neo Geo CDZ (Japan only)
 Namco's Alpine Racer arcade game, including a new type of user interface

Discontinuation 
1996 saw a major shakeup in the crowded home console market, with the Virtual Boy, Atari Jaguar, 3DO Interactive Multiplayer, Sega CD, 32X, and CD-i all being discontinued.

Top-rated games

Game of the Year awards
The following titles won Game of the Year awards for 1996.

Critically acclaimed titles

Famitsu Platinum Hall of Fame 
The following video game releases in 1996 entered Famitsu magazine's "Platinum Hall of Fame" for receiving Famitsu scores of at least 35 out of 40.

Metacritic and GameRankings 
Metacritic (MC) and GameRankings (GR) are aggregators of video game journalism reviews.

Financial performance

Highest-grossing arcade games

Japan
In Japan, the following titles were the highest-grossing arcade games of 1996.

United States
In the United States, the following titles were the highest-grossing arcade video games of 1996.

Australia
On Australia's Timezone monthly arcade charts published in the March 1996 issue of Leisure Line magazine, Sega's Manx TT Super Bike was the top-grossing dedicated arcade cabinet and Namco's Point Blank was the top-grossing arcade conversion kit.

Best-selling video game consoles

Best-selling home video games 
The following titles were the top ten best-selling home video games (console games or computer games) worldwide in 1996.

Japan
In Japan, the following titles were the top ten best-selling home video games of 1996.

United States
In the United States, the following titles were the top ten best-selling home video games of 1996.

Europe
In Europe, the following titles were the best-selling home video games of 1996.

In addition to the PlayStation games listed above, the following titles were the year's best-selling Sega Saturn and PC games in the United Kingdom.

Top game rentals in the United States
In the United States, the following games were the top video game rentals of each month, according to the Video Software Dealers Association (VSDA).

Notable releases

Business 

 February – Blizzard Entertainment acquires a development group known as Condor, renaming it Blizzard North
 April – Eidos Interactive acquires CentreGold plc, which holds Core Design (creator of the Lara Croft character) and U.S. Gold
 May 1 – GameSpot and GameFAQs are launched
 June – Firaxis Games is formed By Jeff Briggs with Sid Meier and Brian Reynolds
 July – GT Interactive purchases Humongous Entertainment
 July 24 – CUC International, Inc purchases Sierra On-Line, Blizzard Entertainment and Davidson & Associates for about $3 billion in a stock swap.
 July 30 - Atari Corporation reverse-merges with JTS, Inc.
 August 6 – AOL buys Sierra's ImagiNation Network from AT&T for a reported $15 million.
 August 24 – Valve is founded.
 September 1 – AOL closes ImagiNation Network, the first online video game with graphics, after 5 years of service.
 November 13 – Tom Clancy and Virtus Corp. found Red Storm Entertainment, headed by Doug Littlejohns
 Infogrames Entertainment SA acquires Ocean Software Ltd.
 Midway Games, Inc. (subsidiary of WMS Industries) acquires Atari Games Corporation from Time Warner.
 Technos Japan Corporation, originator of the Nekketsu Kouha Kunio Kun series and Double Dragon series, goes out of business (assets acquired by Atlus)
 Black Isle Studios forms as a division by Interplay; doesn't use Black Isle name until 1998
 Game Park Inc. founded in South Korea
 The company formed by MicroProse and Spectrum HoloByte in 1993 starts branding using only the MicroProse name
 Overworks, Ltd. formed
 Zed Two Limited formed
 Nintendo of America, Inc. v. Computer & Entertainment, Inc.
 The 3DO Company purchases New World Computing

See also
1996 in games

References

External links

 
Video games by year